Mother's boy, also commonly and informally mummy's boy or mama's boy, is a derogatory term for a man seen as having an unhealthy dependence on his mother at an age at which he is expected to be self-reliant (e.g. live on his own, be economically independent). Use of this phrase is first attested in 1901. The term mama's boy has a connotation of effeminacy and weakness. The counter term, for women, would be daddy's girl (see Electra complex) also possibly involving a father complex. 

In classical Freudian psychoanalytic theory, the term Oedipus complex denotes a child's desire to have sexual relations with the parent of the opposite sex. Sigmund Freud wrote that a child's identification with the same-sex parent is the successful resolution of the Oedipus complex. This theory came into the popular consciousness in America in the 1940s, when sociologists and psychiatrists posited that mothers who were either too close or too distant could hamper the psycho-social development of male children, causing any number of conditions.

See also
 Human bonding
 Norman Bates – fictional serial killer codependent on his mother
 Jewish mother stereotype

References

Male stock characters
Motherhood
Pejorative terms for men